Orrison is a surname. Notable people with the surname include:

Bob Orrison (1928–2011), American film and television stunt performer
Carrol Orrison (born 1929), American politician
Katherine Orrison (born 1948), American set decorator, producer, costumer, and author

See also
Orison (disambiguation)